Ephysteris sporobolella is a moth in the family Gelechiidae. It was described by Bernard Landry in 2010. It is found on the Galápagos Islands.

The length of the forewings is 2.8-3.9 mm. Adults have been recorded on wing from January to June and in November.

Etymology
The species name refers to the host plant, Sporobolus virginicus.

References

Ephysteris
Moths described in 2010